The Wyckoff School District is a community public school district, serving students in pre-kindergarten through eighth grade from Wyckoff in Bergen County, New Jersey, United States.

As of the 2020–21 school year, the district, comprised of five schools, had an enrollment of 1,932 students and 179.2 classroom teachers (on an FTE basis), for a student–teacher ratio of 10.8:1.

The district is classified by the New Jersey Department of Education as being in District Factor Group "I", the second-highest of eight groupings. District Factor Groups organize districts statewide to allow comparison by common socioeconomic characteristics of the local districts. From lowest socioeconomic status to highest, the categories are A, B, CD, DE, FG, GH, I and J.

Public high school students from Wyckoff in ninth through twelfth grades attend the schools of the Ramapo Indian Hills Regional High School District, which also serves students from Franklin Lakes and Oakland. Students entering the district as freshmen have the option to attend either of the district's high schools, subject to a choice made during eighth grade. Franklin Lakes, Oakland and Wyckoff (FLOW district) approved the creation of a regional high school in 1954. Schools in the district (with 2020–21 enrollment data from the National Center for Education Statistics) are
Indian Hills High School, located in Oakland (919 students) and
Ramapo High School, located in Franklin Lakes (1,285 students).

History 
The first school in the town was a one-room school built on Wyckoff Avenue in 1869 and used until 1906, when it was demolished. The first George Washington School had been used but was burned in a fire in 1911. Prior to 1929, high school students attended Central High School in Paterson, before the Board of Education voted to send students to Ramsey High School in Ramsey instead.

Awards and recognition
For the 1998-99 school year, Eisenhower Middle School was named a "Star School" by the New Jersey Department of Education, the highest honor that a New Jersey school can achieve. In the 2003-04 school year, it received the Blue Ribbon Award from the United States Department of Education, the highest honor that an American school can achieve.

For the 2005-06 school year, the Wyckoff School District was recognized with the "Best Practices Award" by the New Jersey Department of Education for its "A Reading Af'fair' to Remember" Language Arts Literacy program at Abraham Lincoln School.

Schools 
Schools in the district (with 2020–21 enrollment data from the National Center for Education Statistics) are:
Elementary schools
Calvin Coolidge Elementary School, with 289 students in grades K-5, located at 420 Grandview Avenue, is an elementary school which opened in 1932 as a 6-room K-6 school and has been expanded several times over the years.
Robert Famularo, Principal
Abraham Lincoln Elementary School, with 304 students in grades K-5, located at 325 Mason Avenue, was dedicated in 1953 on land purchased in 1950.
Patrick Lee, Principal
Sicomac Elementary School, with 297 students in grades PreK-5, located at 356 Sicomac Avenue, was completed in 1967.
Stephen Raimo, Principal
George Washington Elementary School with 346 students in grades K-5, located at 270 Woodland Avenue, was constructed as an 11-room brick building on the site where the previous school had burned down.
Scott Blake, Principal
Middle school
Dwight D. Eisenhower Middle School, with 672 students in grades 6-8, located at 344 Calvin Court, the school was approved in 1960 and dedicated in 1963. 
Brian Faehndrich, Principal

Special education 
Wyckoff is a member of the Northwest Bergen Council for Special Education Region 1, which includes 12 member districts which work together to provide special education services on a regional basis. Wyckoff is responsible for four of the special education classes in the Northwest Council. Special education classes are located in Sicomac School.

Administration
Core members of the district's administration are:
Dr. Kerry Postma, Superintendent of Schools
Patricia Salvati, Business Administrator / Board Secretary

Board of education
The district's board of education is comprised of nine members who set policy and oversee the fiscal and educational operation of the district through its administration. As a Type II school district, the board's trustees are elected directly by voters to serve three-year terms of office on a staggered basis, with three seats up for election each year held (since 2012) as part of the November general election. The board appoints a superintendent to oversee the district's day-to-day operations and a business administrator to supervise the business functions of the district.

References

External links 
Wyckoff Schools

School Data for the Wyckoff School District, National Center for Education Statistics
Ramapo Indian Hills Regional High School District website

Wyckoff, New Jersey
School districts in Bergen County, New Jersey
New Jersey District Factor Group I